Linden is a census-designated place (CDP) in San Joaquin County, California, United States. The population was 1,784 at the 2010 census, up from 1,103 at the 2000 census. The city is host of the Linden Cherry Festival each spring.

Geography
Linden is located at  (38.019989, -121.091450), along California Highway 26 and is approx 13 miles ENE of Stockton. 

Demographics

2010
At the 2010 census Linden had a population of 1,784. The racial makeup of Linden was 1,541 (86.4%) White, 6 (0.3%) African American, 10 (0.6%) Native American, 25 (1.4%) Asian, 1 (0.1%) Pacific Islander, 127 (7.1%) from other races, and 74 (4.1%) from two or more races. Hispanic or Latino of any race were 385 people (21.6%).

The census reported that 1,784 people (100% of the population) lived in households, no one lived in non-institutionalized group quarters and no one was institutionalized.

There were 631 households, 275 (43.6%) had children under the age of 18 living in them, 389 (61.6%) were opposite-sex married couples living together, 76 (12.0%) had a female householder with no husband present, 36 (5.7%) had a male householder with no wife present.  There were 32 (5.1%) unmarried opposite-sex partnerships, and 4 (0.6%) same-sex married couples or partnerships. 106 households (16.8%) were one person and 41 (6.5%) had someone living alone who was 65 or older. The average household size was 2.83.  There were 501 families (79.4% of households); the average family size was 3.18.

The age distribution was 516 people (28.9%) under the age of 18, 118 people (6.6%) aged 18 to 24, 468 people (26.2%) aged 25 to 44, 461 people (25.8%) aged 45 to 64, and 221 people (12.4%) who were 65 or older.  The median age was 36.9 years. For every 100 females, there were 98.2 males.  For every 100 women age 18 and over, there were 99.4 men.

There were 673 housing units at an average density of 90.2 per square mile, of the occupied units 490 (77.7%) were owner-occupied and 141 (22.3%) were rented. The homeowner vacancy rate was 2.0%; the rental vacancy rate was 6.0%.  1,339 people (75.1% of the population) lived in owner-occupied housing units and 445 people (24.9%) lived in rental housing units.

2000
At the 2000 census there were 1,103 people, 384 households, and 316 families in the CDP. The racial makeup of the CDP was 88.03% White, 0.27% African American, 1.63% Native American, 0.82% Asian, 5.62% from other races, and 3.63% from two or more races. Hispanic or Latino of any race were 14.05%.

Of the 384 households 42.4% had children under the age of 18 living with them, 68.8% were married couples living together, 9.9% had a female householder with no husband present, and 17.7% were non-families. Of all households 15.4% were one person and 8.1% were one person aged 65 or older.  The average household size was 2.87 and the average family size was 3.21.

The age distribution was 30.8% under the age of 18, 6.8% from 18 to 24, 25.7% from 25 to 44, 25.0% from 45 to 64, and 11.6% 65 or older.  The median age was 38 years. For every 100 females, there were 100.5 males.  For every 100 females age 18 and over, there were 95.1 males.

The median household income was $51,250 and the median family income  was $57,813. Males had a median income of $56,164 versus $39,750 for females. The per capita income for the CDP was $21,094.  About 9.5% of families and 7.1% of the population were below the poverty line, including 8.5% of those under age 18 and 16.7% of those age 65 or over.

Notable people and events
The 1974 film Dirty Mary, Crazy Larry was filmed in and around Linden.

Pavement, a band hailing from nearby Stockton, immortalizes the town in "Feed 'Em to the (Linden) Lions", song three on their 1992 EP, Watery, Domestic.

The Speed Freak Killers, a serial killer duo, are from Linden.

Ervin Zádor, gold medalist at 1956 Summer Olympics in water polo and famous for being brutally punched in the Blood in the Water match, spent the last years of his life in Linden.

Aaron Judge, a professional baseball player and the 2017 AL Rookie of the Year and 2022  AL Most Valuable Player, is from Linden.

References

External links 
 

Census-designated places in California
Census-designated places in San Joaquin County, California